Mikhail Andreïevitch Arseniev (Russia : Михаил Андреевич Арсеньев; 1779 - 6 November 1838, Toula province, of pneumonia) was a Russian commander in the Napoleonic Wars.

Arseniev participated in both the Patriotic War of 1812 and the subsequent War of the Sixth Coalition, and was acting commander of the Life Guard Horse Regiment from 1811 to 1813.

References

Sources 
https://web.archive.org/web/20070320194101/http://www.hronos.km.ru/img/19vek/arsenev_ma.jpg
http://www.museum.ru/1812/persons/vgzd/vg_a20.html

1779 births
1838 deaths
Russian commanders of the Napoleonic Wars